The 1957–58 season of Alessandria Unione Sportiva's was their 46th in Italian football and their 11th in Serie A.

Back in Serie A after 9 years, Alessandria U.S. built a competitive team, comprehensive of Italy defender Giacomazzi, talented Tagnin and Switzerland forward Vonlanthen.

Alessandria's coaches Robotti and Pedroni settled the team with a strong "catenaccio": the quality of the holding midfielder-line granted good matches, and for a long time the Grigis occupied the first positions of the classification, even if they fell away in the last part of the championship, ending 12th.

In 1957–58 season Alessandria ended as the 3rd best defense in Serie A, with 42 goals against in 34 matches: only Internazionale and Fiorentina did it better.

Roger Vonlanthen, even though he scored only 8 goals (less than the expected), was the top goalscorer.

ClubManagementChairman: Silvio Sacco
Consulors: Amedeo Ruggiero and Remo Sacco
Secretaries: Enrico Reposi and Piero ZorzoliCoaching staffCoaches: Luciano Robotti and Franco Pedroni
Fitness coach: De SistiMedical staff'''Team Doctor: Cesare Bruno
Masseur: Eugenio Taverna

Players

 Transfers 

 In 

 Out 

Profiles and statistics
Melegari (2005), p. 83

Matches

Serie A

Statistics

 League table 

Results by round

Results summary

References

Sources
Ugo Boccassi, Enrico Dericci, Marcello Marcellini. Alessandria U.S.: 60 anni. Milano, G.E.P., 1973.
Marcello Marcellini. Giorni di grigio intenso. Campionato di Serie A 1957-58, la più bella Alessandria del dopoguerra. Alessandria, Litografia Viscardi, 2009.
Mimma Caligaris. Grig100. Un secolo di Alessandria in cento partite. Il Piccolo, Alessandria, 2012.
Fabrizio Melegari. Almanacco Illustrato del Calcio - La Storia 1898-2004''. Panini Edizioni, Modena, September 2005.

Alessandria
U.S. Alessandria Calcio 1912 seasons